Axoni is an American technology company that develops blockchain software for financial institutions. The company caters to trading firms, infrastructure providers, and technology companies in the United States, Europe, and Asia. The company operates Veris, a distributed ledger system used by large financial companies.

History 
Axoni was established in 2013 to build and deploy institutional blockchain and distributed ledger technology similar to the one that powers bitcoin.

This system was developed with other tech companies, namely R3 and IBM. The permissioned distributed ledger network for derivatives is governed by DTCC and also uses Axcore.

Axoni is also a partner of Options Clearing Corporation (OCC), one of the world's largest equity derivatives clearing organization. This platform assists BATS, Cboe, Nasdaq and the NYSE.

Veris 
In 2020, Axoni launched Veris, a distributed ledger network that manages equity swap transactions. This system is designed for matching and reconciling post-trade data on stock swaps. Companies using this network includes BlackRock Inc., Goldman Sachs Group Inc., and Citigroup, Inc. The infrastructure functions as an equity swaps platform, where participating institutions can maintain continual reconciliation of equity swaps until they reach maturity. Trading is synchronized for a transaction throughout its lifecycle and participants are able to relay changes in real-time. Its first recorded swap involved transactions by Citi and Goldman Sachs. It is also based on the Axcore technology, adding to a suite of enterprise software that provides large-scale data management, automation, and development kits (e.g. for distributed application.

References 

Financial services companies established in 2013
American companies established in 2013
Companies based in New York City
Financial technology companies